John Howarth (born 31 October 1958) is a British Labour Party politician who served as a member of the European Parliament (MEP) for South East England from 2017 to 2020.

Howarth succeeded Anneliese Dodds who had represented the seat since the 2014 European Parliament election until she was elected as MP for Oxford East in the 2017 General Election, and he was re-elected at the 2019 European Parliament election.

He was educated in Gateshead at Highfield Comprehensive School and at the University of Essex where he read Economics. He started his career as a Labour Party official, then working and running businesses in Information Technology, Design, Business Communications and Public Affairs. He spent 11 years as a Councillor serving on Berkshire County Council, Reading Borough Council and the South East England Regional Assembly.

Early life and education 
His father, also John Howarth, worked in the coal industry first as a footplateman and later as a traffic foreman on the Bowes railway. His mother Freda Howarth (Robinson) was the daughter of Joe Robinson, a pit deputy at Heworth Colliery. Joe had served in the Northumberland Fusileers Regiment in the First World War and was wounded at Passchendaele (Third Battle of Ypres). During the Second World Ward Freda was an industrial conscript working as a welder in munitions production. John Howarth cites his Grandfather as particularly influential on his early political thinking.

Howarth grew up on the Ellen Wilkinson Estate, a 1950s council housing development now part of Gateshead Borough. He attended Wardley Infant and Junior Schools and Highfield Comprehensive, a purpose-built comprehensive school that opened in 1970 upon the abolition of selection at 11 plus. The school would later be renamed Thomas Hepburn Community School and closed in 2019. He studied Economics at the University of Essex and after graduating gained a master's degree in the History and Theory of 20th Century Art. His MA thesis was on work of the German Director, Werner Herzog.

Political life 
John Howarth became involved with the Labour Party during the February 1974 General Election when his father was on strike. He continued to be involved with Labour election campaigns in October 1974 and the Newcastle Central By-election of 1976 before university. In student politics he became National Secretary of Labour Students. On leaving the student world in 1982 Howarth became a Labour Party constituency organiser in Basingstoke and Secretary of the Hampshire County Labour Party. Having progressed to Labour's Southern Regional Office (covering what is now the South East Region) Howarth left Labour's staff in 1988 to work in the private sector and settled in Reading.

In 1990 Howarth was elected Chair of Reading Labour Party which encompassed both of the town's parliamentary constituencies and the Reading local government functions. He served as Chair until 1994 after which he became Press Officer, a role which he continued for the ten years. He also served as Vice-Chair of Berkshire County Labour Party, Thames Valley European Constituency, the South East Regional Board/Executive and the National Policy Forum.

Working life 
In 1989 Howarth joined a company providing software and IT solutions, working on marketing communications and eventually becoming Director of Marketing and a partner. In 1995 he founded his own business providing marketing consulting services and later brand, design and business communications. He became a member of the Chartered Society of Designers and also worked in public affairs as a consultant for the international business communications firm, Instinctif Partners.

Local government 
In 1993 he contested Redlands Division on Berkshire County Council, winning the seat comfortably. On the county council he served as chair of the Transport Committee and later as vice-chair of the Environment Committee as part of the Labour-Liberal Democrat administration. Howarth was a strong advocate of the abolition of Berkshire County Council and its replacement with Unitary local government. He served five years on the county council until it was dissolved in April 1998.

In 2001 he was elected to Reading Borough Council, by now a unitary council, for Park Ward and was re-elected in 2004. Serving for a year as deputy lead on sport and cultural services, he became the cabinet member responsible for transport and strategic planning and was appointed to the South East England Regional Assembly. He became a member of the UK Government's Regional Transport Board for the South East, the Joint Regional European Committee, the Regional Planning Committee, and the Berkshire Join Strategic Planning Committee. Howarth was also Chair of the Reading Station Project Board, which brought together stakeholders in the successful bid to attract funding for the expansion of the Great Western mainline facilities at Reading railway station. In 2007 he stood down from the Borough Council.

European elections 
In 1994 John Howarth was Labour candidate for the Thames Valley coming close to unseating the Conservative MEP in what was not regarded as a Labour target. He contested South East England as a member of the Labour list at the first election using proportional representation in 1999. In 2013 he put himself forward for the South East Region once again. The ordering of the list – with one male and one female candidate – was determined by a ballot of Labour Party members. John Howarth won the male ballot and was placed second on the list, the decision having been made prior to the selection that the winner of the female ballot would be top of the list.
In the 2014 European Elections Labour fell short of the necessary share of the vote to secure two MEPs in the region. Anneliese Dodds, who had been placed first on the Labour list, represented the seat until 9 June 2017 when she was elected as MP for Oxford East in the 2017 General Election. In the 2019 European Elections, Howarth as sitting MEP led Labour's list in South East England and was elected to the South East region as the only Labour MEP.

Work in the European Parliament 
Howarth served on the European Parliament's Budget Committee (BUDG), the Internal Market and Consumer Protection Committee (IMCO) the Regional Development Committee (REGI) and the Budgetary Control Committee (CONT). He was Vice Chair of the Parliament's Delegation to the countries of South Asia (Pakistan, Sri Lanka, Bangladesh, Bhutan, Nepal and the Maldives) and a member of delegations to CARIFORUM (the Caribbean nations), North Macedonia (then Macedonia) and Palestine. He was a member of the European Parliament Intergroups (all-party groups) for SMEs and for the Creative Industries. He was Rapporteur for the General Budget of the European Union for 2019, the Standing BUDG Rapporteur for the EU Space Programme and Fusion Energy and as BUDG rapporteur and S&D Group shadow on 2021-27 Multiannual Financial Framework legislation for the EU Space Programme, Horizon Europe (FP9), Creative Europe and Erasmus+.

Personal life
John Howarth is married to Jane Coney, a designer. He has two children from his first marriage. and a step daughter. John enjoys music (almost any sort) playing guitar, cooking and art. He swims and plays golf. He has followed Newcastle United since boyhood but came to follow Reading F.C. as his "second team".

References

External links

Profile at European Parliament website

1958 births
Living people
Labour Party (UK) MEPs
Members of Berkshire County Council
MEPs for England 2014–2019
MEPs for England 2019–2020